Pat Mitchell-Firth  (née Firth) is a former England women's international footballer. She represented the England women's national football team at senior international level and spent most of her career at Fodens Ladies F.C..

International career

England
Firth played for England in England's first international match against Scotland in Greenock on 18 November 1972.

Firth also scored a hat-trick in an international against Scotland in 1973 among the 8–0 scoreline.

Honours
Fodens Ladies F.C.
 FA Women's Cup: 1973–74

References

1957 births
People from Leeds
Living people
English women's footballers
England women's international footballers
Fodens Ladies F.C. players
Women's association footballers not categorized by position